Anchorage Island is a tiny uninhabited island located off the southwest coast of Stewart Island/Rakiura, New Zealand and part of Rakiura National Park.

See also

 List of islands of New Zealand
 List of islands
 Desert island

References

Uninhabited islands of New Zealand
Stewart Island
Islands of Southland, New Zealand